Occult Science in Medicine is a book by the German doctor and theosophist Franz Hartmann (1838-1912), published in 1893. The aim of the book was to raise awareness amongst doctors and medical students about valuable medical knowledge from the past that has been ignored and catalogued as occult. The treasures of the past, that the author is concerned with and on which he develops his argument, are mostly extracted from the work and perspective of Theophrastus Paracelsus. On a broad level, the book is a comparison between the medical knowledge, practices and system contemporary to the author and  those predicated by Theophrastus Paracelsus and supported by Theosophy in general. Additionally, an implicit underlying theme of the book is the nature of science and knowledge - the author advocates against conservative science (i.e. the paradigm within which all the scientists, and in particular medical practitioners, conduct their research or perform their job; popular and superficial science) and contrasts it with progressive science (i.e. exploring new realms of knowledge without being constrained by contemporary fashionable theories). From a psychological perspective, there is a dualistic representation of the mind and of the body (in accordance with Descartes' dualism) in relation to the constitution of man, diseases and their place in contemporary medicine.

Historical context 
The book was written in the context of the author being an active member of the Theosophical Society and  a faithful adept of H.P. Blavatsky's viewpoint. The Theosophical Society had significant effects on Western religion, politics, culture and society and it played a significant role in the introduction of Asian religious ideas into the Western world. Furthermore, the book was published the same year Hartmann started editing a German Theosophical monthly journal called Lotusblüten (1893-1900).

Interestingly, the book advocates for dualism in a time when this philosophical view of the mind was perishing. During the end of the 19th century, scientific knowledge was advancing fast and the Mind-Body Dualism was being replaced by Materialism. This new perspective on the mind was advocated by British Empiricists during the 18th and 19th centuries, who were carefully trying to dismiss the idea of an incorporeal, independent mind (i.e. so that they do not upset the Church) as being implausible. We are looking at a time period when people discovered that many brain processes were just reflexes and when Charles Darwin's Evolutionary Theory started to have great impact on Psychology and Philosophy. Notably, the principle of natural selection opposed the teleological view of the world that was established during Aristotle's time and further exploited by the Christian Church - this new concept had remarkable power for explaining directional and adaptive changes without the implication of a divine authority such as God. Consequently, the body starts to be seen as a mechanical device that strives for survival and the place of the soul and immaterial substances (i.e. the mind) has no longer a place in science. This is further supported by the emergence of Behaviourism (i.e. the opposing view to Mind-Body Dualism), with its earliest derivatives traced back to the late 19th century when Edward Thorndike pioneered the law of effect, a process that involved strengthening behavior through the use of reinforcement.

Previous work 
Hartmann's first work on Occultism was Magic, White and Black which appears to be the result of discussions with H.P. Blavatsky; this book can be considered the start of his argument for using the occult side of the nature to advance knowledge, science and medical practice. His second work was The life of Paracelsus and the Substance of his teachings, which reveals that Hartmann was a physician with a profound understanding of the occult philosophy od Theophrastus Paracelsus. These two first publications of Hartmann can be seen as a precursor of soon to be published Occult science in medicine which is an unifying account of how the occult teachings of Theophrastus Paracelsus can be applied to attain true knowledge and advance contemporary medicine.

Structure 
The book consists of five parts, with the most general topic discussed in Part 1 and the most specific points being made in Part 5. Each part is structured as a comparison between contemporary knowledge, science, medicine and their occult counterpart.

Each part introduces a different topic with the heading describing what it is going to be approached:

Part 1: The constitution of man
Part 2: The four pillars of medicine
Part 3: The five causes of disease
Part 4: The five classes of physicians
Part 5: The medicine of the future

The structure being employed makes the argument easy to follow and provides it with unity by implicitly supporting the links between the different parts.

Content

Part 1: The constitution of man 
Given that popular science has no information about the power that drives human development, nor about the nature or the origin of the human mind, it is understandable to look into other sources of information and consider what the Ancient sages taught about the principles that govern the constitution of man. This reasoning is employed as a justification for using occult knowledge.

Theosophical literature summarizes Ancient knowledge regarding the above-mentioned principles as follows - the sevenfold constitution of man:

 Rupa (i.e. physical body);
 Prana (i.e. life, vital principle);
 Linga Sharira (i.e. astral body - counterpart of the physical body);
 Kama rupa (i.e. animal soul);
 Manas (i.e. mind, intelligence - connecting the mortal and immortal man);
 Buddha (i.e. mind, intelligence - connecting the mortal and immortal man);
 Atma  (i.e. spirit);

It is highlighted how Ancient medicine was a religious science, recognizing the source of universal life (Note: The term religion does not refer to any of the existing systems of religious doctrines or forms of worship, but to the spiritual recognition of divine truth) and how popular modern medicine recognizes no real truth because it is concerned only with the lowest plane of existence (i.e. the physical body) by recognizing only the outcome of a blind force. Medicine cannot be separated from religion because the essence of the human being is its divine source (i.e. highest plane of existence) and not the physical body (i.e. lowest plane of existence). This is the recurrent dualistic presentation of the nature of man that is the basis of Hartmann's argument.

Theophrastus Paracelsus is portrayed as the father of medicine and given as example of a physician that recognized the sevenfold constitution of man and used this knowledge to treat his patients.

Part 2: The four pillars of medicine 
The pillars upon which the practice of modern medicine, which is concerned only with the external plane of existence (i.e. the physical world), rests:

 A knowledge of the physical body (i.e. Anatomy, Philology, Pathology)
 Certain amount of acquaintance with physical science;
 Acquaintance with the views and opinions of modern accepted medical authorities (however erroneous they may be);
 A certain amount of judgement and aptitude to put the acquired theories into practice;.

Psychology is portrayed as a misnomer with Hartmann arguing that there can be no science of the soul as long as its existence is not acknowledged.

The author is an adept of Theophrastus Paracelsus' pillars of medicine:

Philosophia - it is not concerned with the Philosophy that existed at the time (i.e. logic, inferences, speculations) but a system in which there is a great deal of love for the truth (i.e. recognition of self in another form). This pillar is  based on the power of recognizing the truth in all things independent of any books or authorities. As depicted by Hartmann, this is an argument against working within a contemporary paradigm because existing theories hinder the ability to see and extract knowledge from nature. This realm of Philosophia includes all the natural sciences referring to external phenomena, but also those sciences concerned with the interior world (Note: the exterior world is a mere expression of the interior world). Hartmann concludes with the mention that a science referring merely to the terrestrial life is not the summit of all possible knowledge, because beyond the realm of visible phenomena there is a far more extensive realm open to all who are capable of entering the realm of truth. Thus, his main poin is that contemporary medicine is good, but not enough because it is concerned only with the physical body.
Astronomia - in contemporary times, it is the science of celestial bodies, but in Theophrastus Paracelsus' view, astronomy represents the various states of the mind existing in the microcosm of nature as well as in the microcosm of man. Interestingly, Hartmann supports Theophrastus Paracelsus' idea that man, far from creating his own thoughts, merely remodels the ideas that flow into his mind. This requires a further consideration of free will and of the amount of responsibility of man; nonetheless, the author does not extend on this idea.
Alchemy - his main aim regarding this topic is merely to remove existing misconceptions and to raise awareness amongst students and doctors - and maybe they will use this knowledge to attain real knowledge. Alchemy (concerned with living spiritual powers and wisdom) and Chemistry (concerned with the physical world) are depicted as being two aspects of the same science (i.e. one is the lower, and the other one is the higher part). He believes that by combining them, science will discover how life emerges from the chemical properties of the physical world.
The virtue of the physician - it is argued that passing an examination and obtaining the title of M.D. does not make you a doctor (i.e. it is just an academical degree). The true physician is ordained by God (i.e. people cannot make someone a doctor, they can only give the right to act as one, but with no the power to heal). Hartmann's main point regarding this topic is best described by Theophrastus Paracelsus' words: Medical wisdom is only given by God.

Part 3: The five causes of disease 
The classification  of the causes of disease, acknowledged by modern medical science, is an enumeration of certain conditions in which disease may arise (e.g. Age, Heredity, Temperament, Mental and moral conditions, Temperature, Epidemic disease, Contagion, Malaria etc.).

Theophrastus Paracelsus' classification is depicted as a better description of the causes of disease. He classifies diseases as those originating in the kingdom of matter (i.e. physical body), within the realm of the soul (i.e. energy) or in the sphere of the spirit (i.e. intelligence). As long as these three substances are in harmony with each other the individual is healthy; an imbalance will result in disease. The five causes of disease advocated by Theophrastus Paracelsus are:

 Ens astrale - diseases arising from external influences (i.e. surrounding conditions);
 Ens veneni - disease originating from poisonous actions and impurities in all three planes of existence;
 Ens naturale - diseases which have their origin in certain conditions inherent in the constitution of man (quality of body, soul and mind as they were received from nature - includes all inherited physical diseases, qualities of temperament and mental peculiarities);
 Ens spirituale - diseases arising from spiritual causes (spirit = consciousness in every plane of existence). Furthermore, the spirit is depicted as having three functions: Will, Imagination, Memory;

From a psychological perspective, the three functions of the soul depicted by Hartmann represent fundamental cognitive processes. Will is presented as being distinct from the selfish desire of the brain - it is a strong power which drives all voluntary and involuntary actions in the organism of man, whether or not we are conscious of it. Imagination is the power of the mind to form images. Memory is presented as the ability of the spirit to visit those places within the sphere of his mind where former experiences are preserved, and thus to bring them again within the field of consciousness. Furthermore, it is highlighted that the brain is just an instrument for perception - thus, Hartmann advocates for a spirit/mind that interacts with the body, using it as an instrument.

 Ens del - diseases arising from eternal retribution (in the East, called the law of Karma) or the action of divine justice throughout the Universe.

Part 4: The five classes of physicians 
Based on Theophrastus Paracelsus' doctrine, the author makes a distinction between:

 Science of the lower methods (i.e. prescribing drugs, using hot/cold water, applying any other physical forces) can be taught to anybody in possession of an ordinary amount of intelligence.
 Science of the higher methods (i.e. the real art of medicine) requires higher gifts that cannot be acquired in any other way than according to the law of spiritual evolution and higher development of the inner man.

Accordingly, there are lower and higher order physicians. Theophrastus Paracelsus' five classes of physicians are:

 Three lower classes (they seek for resources in the material plane):
 Naturales - They employ physical remedies acting as opposites - e.g. using cold water for fever (Allopaths - regular practitioners);
 Specifici - They use physical remedies which experience has shown to work for specific problems ( Empirics, Homeopaths - regular practitioners that have knowledge about how some remedies work in specific situations - the result of observation, and not of knowledge of the fundamental laws of nature);
 Characterales - They employ the power of the mind - act upon the will and imagination of the patients (Mind healer, Mesmerism)
 Two higher classes (they employ remedies belonging to the super sensual plane):
 Spirituales - They are in possession of spiritual powers, using the magic power of their own will and thought (Magic, Psychometry, Hypnotism, Spiritism);
 Fideles - through whom "miraculous" works are performed in the power of the true faith (Adepts).

Part 5: The medicine of the future 
In the final part, the author reflects on the progress of science since the time of Theophrastus Paracelsus and concludes that even though knowledge has been advanced, it does not mean that human kind is wiser. He believes that more spiritual knowledge is needed in order to attain wisdom. Furthermore, in order to attain this spiritual knowledge, the author encourages his readers to get to know their constitution and the nature of the higher power that resides in them.

Hartmann supports Theophrastus Paracelsus' view that wisdom is not the intellect of the terrestrial, but the understanding of the celestial mind. Thus, he encourages spiritual self-knowledge and the use of the higher order knowledge to advance the field of medicine.

Reception 
In 1894, Occult Science in Medicine was seen as an important manuscript that provided access to the system of medicine of Paracelsus in times when materialistic empiricism in medicine seemed to approach its end while the importance of the mind (i.e. thought) was beginning to be recognized again in the cure of disease. Nevertheless, The Physician of the Future chapter was seen as the weakest part of the book because the priest becomes discredited as a physician. In general, the book was seen as superior to contemporary materialistic medical science which was portrayed as being far from any intelligent appreciation of the ideas portrayed by Hartmann.

Evaluating the theosophical situation today reveals that theosophy is not dying out, but rather, experiencing a renaissance. Given such circumstances, it is not surprising that Franz Hartmann's work is republished and appreciated in the 21st century, with appreciative comments from readers.

References 

1893 non-fiction books
Alternative medicine publications
Health fraud
History books about the occult
Pseudoscience literature
Psychology books